Montenegrina is a genus of air-breathing land snails, terrestrial pulmonate gastropod mollusks in the family Clausiliidae, the door snails, all of which have a clausilium.

Species
Species within the genus Montenegrina include:
 Montenegrina cattaroensis

References

 Nomenclator Zoologicus info

Clausiliidae